Aquinas Hall (also known as Nancy Wilgenbusch Hall) is a building on the now defunct Marylhurst University campus in Marylhurst, Oregon, United States. The building was designed by Joseph Jacobberger and Alfred Smith, and completed . Aquinas Hall exhibits the Mediterranean architectural style, and was used as student housing, and later administrative offices until the university closed in late 2018.

References

External links
 

1930 establishments in Oregon
Buildings and structures completed in 1930
Joseph Jacobberger buildings
Marylhurst University